Asbjørn Rødseth (born 19 March 1951) is a Norwegian economist.

He was born in Harstad, and graduated with the cand.oecon. degree in 1976. He has been professor at the University of Oslo from 1989. He was the dean of the Faculty of Social Sciences until 2007.

Rødseth has been a board member of Norges Bank, the Norwegian Central Bank, since 1 January 2004, and is currently serving his second term, which expires on 31 December 2011.

References

1951 births
Living people
Norwegian economists
Academic staff of the University of Oslo
People from Harstad